Cryder is a surname. Notable people with the surname include:

Bob Cryder (born 1956), American football player
Brooks Cryder (born 1955), American soccer player

Americanized surnames